The 2002–03 season is East Bengal Football Club's 7th season in the National Football League, and also marks the club's 83rd season. Coached by Subhash Bhowmick, East Bengal won all five trophies from the five tournaments they participated in, including their second National league title, competing in the 2002–03 NFL. They also won the 2002 Calcutta Football League, 2002 Durand Cup and 2002 IFA Shield and the 2002 Independence Day Cup. This was the third instance in the history of East Bengal club that the club had won 5 trophies in a season, the other two back in 1972 and 1973 during P.K. Banerjee's reign.

First-team squad
East Bengal FC squad for the 2002–03 season.

Coach:  Subhash Bhowmick
Team doctor: Dr. S R Dasgupta
Team manager: Swapan Ball

Stadiums
Kingfisher East Bengal F.C. have been using both the Salt Lake Stadium and the East Bengal Ground since Salt Lake Stadium opened in 1984. As of today the Salt Lake Stadium is used for East Bengal's I-League, AFC Cup, and Federation Cup games. The East Bengal Ground is used for the Calcutta Football League matches.

Competitions

Overall

Matches

Calcutta Football League

Independence Day Cup
East Bengal club went to Nagaon, Assam to participate in the 54th Independence Day Cup tournament after the end of the Championship Group round matches of the Calcutta League. The club won the tournament defeating Oil India FC of Assam by 2–0 with goals from Alvito D'Cunha and Chandan Das.

Durand Cup
East Bengal club participated in the 115th Durand Cup held in Delhi being grouped in Group B along with MEG, Bangalore and Air India. The team won their third tournament of the season after defeating Army XI in the final by 3–0 margin.

IFA Shield
Just days after winning the Durand Cup, the club participated in the IFA Shield held in Kolkata and was grouped alongside Indian Bank, Churchill Brothers and Tollygunge Agragami in Group A. The team reached the final defeating Vasco in the Semi-Final and lifted their 4th trophy of the season by defeating Churchill Brothers in the final via a penalty shootout, with Sashti Duley scoring the winning penalty in the sudden-death.

Sponsors
Main Sponsor: Kingfisher (Parent Company United Breweries Group is 50% stake holder in the club).

References

East Bengal Club seasons